Guy Bolagh-e Pain (also Romanized as  Gūy Bolāgh-e Pā’īn; also known as Gūy Bolāgh-e Bālā, Kūy Bolāgh-e Pā’īn, Shāh Bolāgh, Shāh Bolāgh-e Pā’īn, Shāhbolāghī Pā’īn, Shāh Bolāghī-ye Pā’īn, Shāh Bolāgh Pā’īn, Shah Bolagh Sofla, and Shakh-Bulag-ashagy) is a village in Esperan Rural District, in the Central District of Tabriz County, East Azerbaijan Province, Iran. At the 2006 census, its population was 83, in 20 families.

References 

Populated places in Tabriz County